Gamelab was an independent game studio in New York City, New York founded by game designer Eric Zimmerman and Peter Seung-Taek Lee in 2000. It is best known for creating Diner Dash, one of the most downloaded games of all time (over half a billion times across multiple platforms in its first six years), as well as its two spin-off companies, the non-profit Institute of Play and the online game and community site Gamestar Mechanic.

History
Zimmerman and Lee (with audio by Michael Sweet) created a game called BLiX, which was named a Finalist (and eventually won Best Audio) at the 2000 Independent Games Festival at the Game Developers Conference, Zimmerman and Lee then incorporated gameLab and used an advance on BLiX royalties from their exclusivity deal with Shockwave.com to open an office in downtown Manhattan. gameLab released 34 video games on multiple platforms between 2000 and 2009, published by companies like LEGO, HBO, PlayFirst, VH-1, and iWin, plus eight massively multiplayer social games created exclusively for and played at the yearly Game Developers Conference from 2001 to 2008.

In 2004, gameLab released the award-winning Diner Dash, a strategy and time management game published by PlayFirst, then-director of game design Frank Lantz and students in his Big Games class (including gameLab employees Greg Trefry and Mattia Romeo) at New York University's Interactive Telecommunications Program created Pac-Manhattan, a real life version of Pac-Man played in the streets surrounding NYU, which was one of the earliest and most influential pervasive games, covered by the New York Times and receiving worldwide press. In 2005, gameLab employees Trefry, Romeo, Nicholas Fortugno, and Catherine Herdlick plus co-founder Lee co-founded Come Out & Play, an annual festival of new original big games played in the streets of New York City, Lantz left to co-found the game studio area/code, which was acquired by Zynga in 2011 and became Zynga New York, and is now the director of New York University's Game Center.

In 2007, gameLab spun off the non-profit Institute of Play to promote game design and play as educational tools for students, within six months of its founding, Institute of Play received a grant from the John D. and Catherine T. MacArthur Foundation to develop Quest to Learn, a New York City public school designed around game design principles. In 2009, supported by another grant from the John D. and Catherine T. MacArthur Foundation, gameLab partnered with Katie Salen and released the award-winning game and community site Gamestar Mechanic. gameLab closed in 2009 and sold its assets to Arkadium.

Video games

Massively Multiplayer Social Games at GDC

References

Defunct video game companies of the United States
Video game companies established in 2000
Video game development companies